The Uttarakhand Legislative Assembly is the unicameral legislature of the Indian state of Uttarakhand.

The seats of the legislative assembly are at Dehradun and Gairsain, the capitals of the state. The term of the Legislative Assembly is five years, unless dissolved earlier. It currently has 70 members, who are directly elected from single-seat constituencies. Currently there are 13 reserved seats for scheduled caste and 2 for Scheduled Tribes.

List of constituencies
The following is the list of the constituencies of the Uttarakhand Legislative Assembly as of recent-most delimitation of the legislative assembly constituencies in 2008.

See also
List of former constituencies of the Uttarakhand Legislative Assembly
List of parliamentary constituencies in Uttarakhand

References

External links
  

Constituencies
Uttarakhand